Armenian National Airlines CJSC dba Fly Arna, styled as Fly Arna, is an Armenian low-cost airline based in Yerevan, Armenia. It is a joint-venture between low-cost carrier Air Arabia and the Armenian government-owned Armenia National Interests Fund (ANIF).

History
The airline was created following a joint-venture agreement signed between Emirati carrier Air Arabia and the recently established Armenia National Interests Fund (ANIF) in July 2021. 51% of the airline's shares are owned by ANIF and the remaining 49% by Air Arabia.  

In May 2022, the airline received its Air Operator's Certificate and added its first aircraft. The airline has selected the Airbus A320 aircraft to build its fleet, in order to maintain fleet commonality with its parent airline, Air Arabia.

The airline commenced operations with flights to Hurghada on July 3rd, 2022 and to Sharm El Sheikh on July 4th, 2022. The airline has announced plans to commence flights to Kuwait and Beirut as the next destinations, continuing with its plans to connect the Middle East with Armenia.

In January 2023, the company announced that it would start flights to the Sheremetyevo International Airport in Moscow and to the Pulkovo Airport in Saint Petersburg.

Destinations

Fleet

See also
 List of airlines of Armenia
 List of airports in Armenia
 List of the busiest airports in Armenia
 Transport in Armenia

References

External links
 Fly Arna on Facebook

Airlines of Armenia
Airlines established in 2021
Low-cost carriers